His Last Twelve Hours (French: Pour l'amour du ciel, Italian: È più facile che un cammello...) is a 1951 French-Italian drama film directed by Luigi Zampa and starring Jean Gabin, Mariella Lotti and Elli Parvo. The film's sets were designed by the art director Gastone Medin. It was shot at the Centro Sperimentale di Cinematografia near Cinecittà in Rome.

Plot
Died in a car accident, the wealthy footwear industrialist Carlo Bacchi finds himself in the afterlife, where he is condemned to hell for having committed evil when he was alive. Defending himself from the accusation in a passionate harangue, however, he manages to get back to earth for a few hours, in order to repair the evil committed and above all the bad deed that caused Amedeo Santini's attempted suicide.

Cast
 Jean Gabin as Carlo Bacchi
 Mariella Lotti as Margot, Bacchi's wife
 Julien Carette as  Amedeo Santini
 Elli Parvo as Lidia Guidi, Bacchi's friend
 Antonella Lualdi as Maria
 Antonietta Pietrosi as Anna, Carlo Bacchi's daughter
 Paola Borboni as Luisa
 Carlo Sposito as The Duke Sorino 
 Marga Cella as Mrs. Gigliosi
 Fausto Guerzoni as A worker
 Piero Pastore as A working trade unionist
 Dante Maggio as The cobbler
 Enrico Luzi as Witness of the accident
 Dino Raffaelli as Giuseppe
 Bella Starace Sainati as Luisa, Bacchi's aunt
 Bice Valori as Witness of the accident

References

Bibliography
 Chiti, Roberto & Poppi, Roberto. Dizionario del cinema italiano: Dal 1945 al 1959. Gremese Editore, 1991.

External links

1951 films
1951 drama films
French drama films
Films scored by Nino Rota
1950s Italian-language films
Italian black-and-white films
Films directed by Luigi Zampa
Films with screenplays by Suso Cecchi d'Amico
Films with screenplays by Cesare Zavattini
Italian drama films
Pathé films
1950s Italian films
1950s French films